The 2016 Motor City Open is an International 70 tournament of the PSA World Tour. This 2016 edition of the Motor City Open took place at the Birmingham Athletic Club in Detroit, Michigan, in the United States on January 22–25, 2016. Ali Farag won his first Motor City Open title, beating Nick Matthew in the final.

Prize money and ranking points
For 2016, the prize purse was $70,000. The prize money and points breakdown is as follows:

Seeds

Draw and results

References

External links
PSA Motor City Open 2015 website
Motor City Open 2016 official website

Motor City Open (squash)
2016 in American sports
2016 in sports in Michigan
2016 in squash